Guillermo Edghill Jr (p.k.a. Big Joon, stylized as BiG JooN!) is an American record producer, mix engineer, programmer, recording engineer, remixer, composer, arranger, instrumentalist and musician from New York City. He has worked with recording artists such as araabMUZIK, Mark Battles, Jarren Benton, Tamar Braxton, Mariah Carey, Ginuwine, Jay-Z, Jennifer Lopez, and Mims, and on hit records including Always Be My Baby, Candy Rain, Jenny From The Block, and SWV's You're The One.

JooN has collaborated with and/or consulted for Grammy Award-nominated or winning producers !llmind, Dr. Luke, Allen "AllStar" Gordon, Max Martin, Troy Oliver, Rockwilder, Cory Rooney, Trackmasters, and Bryce Wilson.

His work has been featured on gold, platinum and multi-platinum albums and singles, led to artists acquiring 14 major label recording and publishing deals and has landed 37 major label song placements and 44 altogether. Projects he has worked on have sold over 20 million units worldwide and have over 100 million views/plays on the internet.

He is currently a producer-engineer at MixYourHit and Rakateer Music in New York City.

Discography

References

1970 births
Living people